Yenesu Cave is a cave in Kırklareli Province, northwestern Turkey.

Location
It is accessible on the route Vize-Kıyıköy, Kıyıköy-Aksicim-Balkaya or Saray-Bahçeköy-Aksicim-Balkaya.

Characteristcis
Yenisu Cave consists of two caves formed in two different geological ages, which are found at two levels. The main gallery, which follows a collapsed hall right at the entrance, is the most active part. Here, there are several ponds and lakes of  depth with dripstones, stalactites, stalagmites and draperies.

The cave was explored by the geologists of the state-owned Mineral Research and Exploration Company (MTA). According to the Deputy Director of Culture and Tourism in Kırklareli, the opening of the cave to tourism in 2015 is projected. The visiting period is to be determined by the Nature Board of the province in accordance with the bat population in the cave.

References

Caves of Turkey
Landforms of Kırklareli Province
Vize District